Giles Calvert (baptised 1612 – 1663) was a prominent printer during the English Revolution, developing a catalogue which included such notable preachers as John Saltmarsh.

References

English Dissenters
English printers
17th-century printers
1663 deaths
Year of birth unknown
English Revolution